Alumni Field is the on-campus soccer stadium at Wright State University in Fairborn, Ohio, United States.

The field was dedicated in 1999 and is so named because it was built through a gift from the Wright State University Alumni Association. The stadium seats 1,000 fans and is also used for local semi-professional, amateur, and youth soccer events.

External links
 Information at WSU athletics

Soccer venues in Ohio
Wright State Raiders soccer
Sports venues in Dayton, Ohio
College soccer venues in the United States
1999 establishments in Ohio
Sports venues completed in 1999